Cesare Poggi (1803–1859) was an Italian painter, active in the Neoclassic style of grand manner history depiction, mainly around his native city of Milan. He was a pupil of Luigi Sabatelli, but after 1824 studied  in Venice and Rome. 
He died at Milan, where he became a member of the Academy of Painters.

References

1803 births
1859 deaths
19th-century Italian painters
Italian male painters
Painters from Milan
19th-century Italian male artists